Timothée Dieng (born 9 April 1992) is a French professional footballer who plays for  club Gillingham. He plays mainly as a midfielder, but can also operate as a defender.

Career

Brest
On 23 January 2013, Dieng made his debut for Brest in the Coupe de France, coming on as a substitute at half time in the 3–1 victory over CA Bastia. On 18 May, Dieng made his Ligue 1 debut, starting in the 3–1 loss to Paris Saint-Germain.

Oldham Athletic
On 14 July 2014, Dieng joined English League One side Oldham Athletic on a two-year contract. Dieng made his debut for the club, starting and playing for 63 minutes against Leyton Orient.

Bradford City
In July 2016 Dieng signed for League One club Bradford City on a two-year contract following a trial. He scored his first goal for Bradford in an EFL Trophy tie against Stoke City Under-23s on 30 August 2016. He was offered a new contract by Bradford City at the end of the 2017–18 season. He left Bradford in June 2018.

Southend United

In June 2018 Dieng signed for Southend United on a two-year contract after turning down a contract offer from Bradford City. Under Sol Campbell's management, Dieng became an integral member of the first team, and was appointed captain.

Exeter City 
On 20 July 2021, Dieng joined League Two side Exeter City on a free transfer, signing a one-year deal. On 3 December 2021 he signed a contract extension, tying him to the Devon side until 2024.

On 23 April 2022 he was named as the side's Player of the Season for 2021–22, 4 days before Exeter secured promotion to League One. He was also named in the League Two Team of the Season for 2021–22.

Gillingham 
On 11 January 2023, Dieng dropped back down to League Two, signing for Gillingham after an undisclosed release clause was triggered.

Personal life
Born in France, Dieng is of Senegalese descent. He is the older brother of the footballer Nathanaël Dieng.

Career statistics

Honours
Exeter City
League Two runner-up: 2021–22

Individual

 EFL League Two Team of the Season: 2021–22
 Exeter City Player of the Season: 2021–22

References

Living people
1992 births
Association football defenders
Sportspeople from Grenoble
Stade Brestois 29 players
Oldham Athletic A.F.C. players
Bradford City A.F.C. players
Southend United F.C. players
Exeter City F.C. players
Gillingham F.C. players
English Football League players
Championnat National 3 players
Ligue 1 players
Ligue 2 players
French footballers
French sportspeople of Senegalese descent
French expatriate footballers
Expatriate footballers in England
French expatriate sportspeople in England
Footballers from Auvergne-Rhône-Alpes